European route E17 passes through the following cities:

 
 : Antwerp → Sint-Niklaas → Ghent → Kortrijk
 
 : Tourcoing → Lille
 : Lille → Arras
 : Arras → Cambrai → Saint-Quentin → Laon → Reims
 : Reims → Châlons-en-Champagne
 : Châlons-en-Champagne → Troyes
 : Troyes → Langres
 : Langres → Beaune

External links 

 UN Economic Commission for Europe: Overall Map of E-road Network (2007)
 E-17 on OpenStreetMap

17
E017
E017